Slade Cecconi (born June 24, 1999) is an American professional baseball pitcher in the Arizona Diamondbacks organization.

Amateur career
Cecconi attended Trinity Preparatory School in Winter Park, Florida, where he played baseball. As a junior in 2017, he went 6–1 with a 0.70 ERA and seventy strikeouts over forty innings. That summer, he was selected to play in the Under Armour All-America Baseball Game at Wrigley Field. In 2018, his senior year, he batted .388 with six home runs. He was selected by the Baltimore Orioles in the 38th round of the 2018 Major League Baseball draft, but did not sign, instead enrolling at the University of Miami where he played college baseball.

In 2019, Cecconi's freshman year at Miami, he appeared in 17 games (13 starts) in which he went 5–4 with a 4.16 ERA, striking out 89 batters over eighty innings. He was selected to play in the Cape Cod Baseball League for the Wareham Gatemen but did not participate. As a sophomore in 2020, he started four games and posted a 2–1 record with a 3.80 ERA over  innings before the season was cut short due to the COVID-19 pandemic.

Professional career
Cecconi was selected by the Arizona Diamondbacks with the 33rd overall pick in the 2020 Major League Baseball draft. On July 10, 2020, Cecconi signed with the Diamondbacks for a $2.4 million bonus. He did not play a minor league game in 2020 due to the cancellation of the minor league season caused by the pandemic. 

To begin the 2021 season, Cecconi was assigned to the Hillsboro Hops of the High-A West. He was on the injured list with a wrist injury to begin the year, but began play in mid-May. On August 1, he was placed back on the injured list with an elbow injury, and, on August 5, was transferred to the 60-day injured list, effectively ending his season. Over 12 starts for the year, Cecconi went 4-2 with a 4.12 ERA, striking out 63 and walking twenty over 59 innings. He was selected to play in the Arizona Fall League for the Salt River Rafters after the season. He was assigned to the Amarillo Sod Poodles of the Double-A Texas League for the 2022 season. Over 25 starts, Cecconi posted a 7-6 record with a 4.37 ERA and 127 strikeouts over  innings.

References

External links

Miami Hurricanes bio

1999 births
Living people
Baseball players from Florida
Baseball pitchers
Miami Hurricanes baseball players
Wareham Gatemen players
Hillsboro Hops players
Amarillo Sod Poodles players
Salt River Rafters players